ChaiFM is a South African Jewish
community radio station broadcasting to the greater Johannesburg area on 101.9 FM. It broadcasts 24 hours a day six days a week, taking a break from Friday night to Saturday night because of Shabbat.

See also
Melbourne Jewish Radio (Lion FM)

References

External links
 http://www.chaifm.com/

Radio stations in Johannesburg